Mottingham is a district of south-east London, England, which straddles the border of both the London Borough of Bromley and the Royal Borough of Greenwich. It is located north east of Bromley Town Centre, . It was historically within the county of Kent.

History

Toponymy 
The earliest records of Mottingham are from 862 AD when it was recorded as Modingahema, which means the land of Moda's people and is commonly interpreted as "the proud place". In William Henry Ireland's 1830 work England's Topographer: Or A New and Complete History of the County of Kent Volume 4, he writes

In the seventeenth century Thomas Fuller recorded in The Worthies of England a curious incident that happened on 4 August 1585:

The cause of the incident, referred to as a "marvellous accident" at the time, was then unknown, and it is likely that a sinkhole had developed. The area is well coursed with streams, both above and below ground, and the collapse or shifting of subsoil might be attributed to them. The site of the sinkhole is now unknown, and the incident is also largely unknown. The only body of standing water that is in the area today is a lake at The Tarn Bird Sanctuary.

Mottingham was originally a farming hamlet, with a few large houses on Mottingham Lane, one of them Fairy Hall. Development began in the mid-19th century with the building of cottages on what is now Mottingham Road and the Terrace shops. Mottingham station opened in 1866, but was originally named for Eltham. In the 1880s the West Park estate, housing intended for the middle class, was developed and St. Andrew's church was built between the station and the village.

The opening of the Sidcup arterial road in 1923 led to suburban development at Mottingham, with the London County Council creating the Mottingham estate, with 2,000 houses, schools and shops, on Court Farm. The estate opened in 1935. The King and Queen pub, later used as a performance venue, opened in 1937; it was replaced by housing in 1992.

In January 2019, Bromley council approved the borough's Local Plan, a document outlining how and where Bromley will be developed up to 2030. Policy 18 details the commitment to improve the vitality and viability of the Mottingham Local Centre and Kimmeridge Cross Neighbourhood Centre, and to enhance links to other areas of Bromley and adjoining boroughs, particularly in relation to centres of employment.

Local government 
Mottingham was originally a hamlet in Eltham parish, in the Blackheath hundred of Kent. In 1840 it was included in the Metropolitan Police District by the Metropolitan Police Act 1839. In 1866, the same year the station was opened, Mottingham was separated from Eltham as a distinct civil parish.

When the County of London was created in 1889, Mottingham was excluded from the new county and formed a protrusion of Kent, bordering London to the west, north and east. From 1894 to 1934, it formed a 'detached part' of Bromley Rural District and had its own parish council. In 1931, the parish had a population of 2,120. In 1934, the rural district and the Mottingham civil parish were abolished and the area was transferred to Chislehurst and Sidcup Urban District. In 1965, the urban district was abolished and the area was transferred from Kent to Greater London, to form part of the London Borough of Bromley. The boundary between Bromley and Greenwich, and between Bromley and Lewisham, around Mottingham was adjusted in 1994. Most of Mottingham is contained within the Mottingham and Chislehurst North ward of Bromley constituency, but the area around Mottingham Station is in the Coldharbour and New Eltham ward of Eltham constituency.

Landmarks 

The first church in Mottingham was St Andrew's Church on Court Road, which was established in 1884 and further helped establish Mottingham as separate from Eltham.

Sir Robert Geffrye's almshouses on Mottingham Road were built by the Ironmongers' Company in 1912 to replace the almshouses in Hoxton that are now the Museum of the Home; they were remodelled by the Greater London Council and additional housing built in the grounds.

Martins Bank had a branch in Mottingham village, facing the war memorial; it was the first branch of the bank to undergo an armed raid, in 1967. It became a Barclays following their 1969 takeover of Martins, was closed in 1992.

Also by the war memorial stood the Porcupine Inn public house, licensed as long ago as 1688. The premises dated from about 1800 and were replaced in 1922. The pub closed in 2013 and was acquired by German global discount supermarket chain Lidl, who have tried and failed to obtain permission to develop the site. As of 2022, Lidl appealed over the head of Bromley Borough and were given permission to clear the site and build their new supermarket.

Mottingham has a branch of the fraternal order Independent Order of Oddfellows Manchester Unity.

Mottingham village contains a sign depicting Eltham College within the branches of a tree, a cricket bat and ball (making reference to W G Grace) and the date AD 862.

Mottingham and some of its landmarks appear in filmmaker Dewyne Lindsay's mini-documentary series London Districts.

Education

Mottingham Primary School

Castlecombe Primary School

Capel Manor College 
Capel Manor College offers further and higher education on a campus that was previously part of Hadlow College.

Eltham College 

Eltham College, an independent day school for girls and boys 7–18, founded in 1842 as the London Missionary Society's School for the Sons of Missionaries, has been housed since 1912 in the former Fairy Hall in Mottingham, which had earlier been the Royal Naval School from 1889 to 1910.

Geography

Mottingham borders Eltham to the north, New Eltham to the east, Chislehurst to the south, Elmstead to the south west, Lewisham to the west and Lee to the north west. Since 2010, Mottingham has fallen within the Mottingham and Chislehurst North polling and policing districts.

Quaggy
A tributary of the River Quaggy known as the Little Quaggy flows through Mottingham; rising on the borders of Chislehurst and Mottingham, it flows through The Tarn and emerges alongside the Sidcup bypass to join the Quaggy, which continues to Mottingham playing fields (colloquially known as 'Foxes Field').

Mottingham Estate

London County Council bought the Court Farm estate in the early 1930s and planned a 2000 home cottage estate. The first houses were to the west of Mottingham Road and completed in 1935. The estate was fairly self-contained; the community facilities included a shopping centre and several schools.

The British gangster film Piggy was filmed around North Kent, Mottingham and London and one scene was filmed in The Prince of Wales pub on Mottingham Road. African American boxer Frank Craig trained at the Prince of Wales for the bout he ultimately lost to Australian Dan Creedon in 1895.

Coldharbour Estate
In 1946 Woolwich Council built the Coldharbour Estate to the east of Mottingham Road, primarily to provide accommodation for local people made homeless by the Blitz. This completed the use of the LCC land.

Transport

Rail
Mottingham railway station serves the district with Southeastern services to London Charing Cross, London Cannon Street via both Lewisham and Woolwich Arsenal, and Dartford.

Bus
124 to Eltham and to Catford via Grove Park
126 to Eltham and to Bromley via Grove Park
161 to North Greenwich via Eltham & Woolwich and to Chislehurst
273 to Lewisham Tesco and to Petts Wood
624 to Woolwich and to Grove Park (school bus)
638 to Kemnal College and to Coney Hall (school bus)

Notable residents
W. G. Grace, cricketer
Eric Liddell, athlete and missionary
Denis Healey, politician
Rob Beckett, stand-up comedian
 Sir John Bertram Adams, physicist
 Jeffrey Lawal-Balogun, athlete
 Charles Folkard, illustrator

References

External links

Districts of the London Borough of Bromley
Districts of the Royal Borough of Greenwich
Areas of London